Ring of Fear is a 1954 American film noir directed by James Edward Grant and starring Clyde Beatty and Mickey Spillane as themselves. The cast also featured Pat O'Brien, Sean McClory and Marian Carr. Additional scenes were directed by William A. Wellman. It was shot in CinemaScope and Warnercolor. It was designed partly to take advantage of the popular success of the Mike Hammer adaptations produced by Victor Saville for United Artists.

Synopsis
With a deranged killer on the loose in his circus, lion tamer Beatty calls in mystery writer Spillane to solve the case.

Cast
Clyde Beatty as Himself
Mickey Spillane as Himself
Pat O'Brien as Frank Wallace
Sean McClory as Dublin O'Malley
Marian Carr as Valerie St. Dennis
John Bromfield as Armand St. Dennis
Pedro Gonzalez Gonzalez as Pedro Gonzales 
Emmett Lynn as Twitchy
Jack Stang as Himself
Kenneth Tobey as Shreveport
Kathy Cline as Suzette St. Dennis
 Queenie Leonard as Tillie 
Larri Thomas as Strong Woman
 Karl Wallenda as Trapeze Performer
 Henry Rowland as 	Lunch Counter Proprietor 
 Forrest Taylor as 	Psychiatrist 
 Vince Barnett as Vendor

References

Bibliography
 Collins, Max Allan & Traylor, James L. Mickey Spillane on Screen: A Complete Study of the Television and Film Adaptations. McFarland, 2018.

External links

1954 films
Circus films
CinemaScope films
Films directed by William A. Wellman
Films produced by John Wayne
Films directed by James Edward Grant
Films scored by Arthur Lange
Films scored by Emil Newman
Batjac Productions films
1950s mystery films
American mystery films
Warner Bros. films
1950s English-language films
1950s American films